In coding theory, a generator matrix is a matrix whose rows form a basis for a linear code. The codewords are all of the linear combinations of the rows of this matrix, that is, the linear code is the row space of its generator matrix.

Terminology

If G is a matrix, it generates the codewords of a linear code C by

 

where w is a codeword of the linear code C, and s is any input vector. Both w and s are assumed to be row vectors. A generator matrix for a linear -code has format , where n is the length of a codeword, k is the number of information bits (the dimension of C as a vector subspace), d is the minimum distance of the code, and q is size of the finite field, that is, the number of symbols in the alphabet (thus, q = 2 indicates a binary code, etc.).

The standard form for a generator matrix is,
 ,
where  is the  identity matrix and P is a  matrix. When the generator matrix is in standard form, the code C is systematic in its first k coordinate positions.

A generator matrix can be used to construct the parity check matrix for a code (and vice versa). If the generator matrix G is in standard form, then the parity check matrix for C is 
 ,
where  is the transpose of the matrix .

G is a  matrix, while H is a  matrix.

Equivalent codes
Codes C1 and C2 are equivalent (denoted C1 ~ C2) if one code can be obtained from the other via the following two transformations:

 arbitrarily permute the components, and
 independently scale by a non-zero element any components.

Equivalent codes have the same minimum distance.

The generator matrices of equivalent codes can be obtained from one another via the following elementary operations:

 permute rows
 scale rows by a nonzero scalar
 add rows to other rows
 permute columns, and
 scale columns by a nonzero scalar.

Thus, we can perform Gaussian elimination on G. Indeed, this allows us to assume that the generator matrix is in the standard form. More precisely, for any matrix G we can find an invertible matrix U such that , where G and  generate equivalent codes.

See also
 Hamming code (7,4)

Notes

References

Further reading

External links
 Generator Matrix at MathWorld

Coding theory